is a Japanese football player. He plays for Fukushima United FC.

Playing career
Yosuke Komuta joined to J2 League club; Thespakusatsu Gunma in 2015.

Club statistics
Updated to 22 February 2019.

References

External links

Profile at Thespakusatsu Gunma

1992 births
Living people
Komazawa University alumni
Association football people from Tochigi Prefecture
Japanese footballers
J2 League players
J3 League players
Thespakusatsu Gunma players
Fukushima United FC players
Association football forwards